Fabens is a census-designated place (CDP) in El Paso County, Texas, United States. The population was 8,257 at the 2010 census. It is part of the El Paso Metropolitan Statistical Area.   The ZIP Codes encompassing the CDP area are 79836 and 79838.

Fabens is the birthplace of jockey Bill Shoemaker.

Geography
Fabens is located at  (31.505072, -106.154129).

Most visitors only stop for short periods of time to eat at one of the several restaurants or stay overnight in the hotel.

History
The city name of Fabens comes from attorney George Wilson Fabens, who worked for the Southern Pacific Railroad.  He was the assistant land commissioner for the Southern Pacific Lines in Texas and Louisiana.  As the railroad was being built, new towns were named after railroad officers. 

Mr. Fabens was born on October 29, 1857 in Marblehead, Massachusetts.  He was one of 7 siblings.  He died in Marblehead on November 17, 1939 at age 82.  His parents were Captain Samuel Augustus Fabens and Mary Glover Wilson Fabens.

Film location
In April 1972, Fabens served as a location for the filming of the Sam Peckinpah film The Getaway. The crime drama, starring Steve McQueen and Ali MacGraw, was replete with explosions, car chases and intense shootouts. The film would become Peckinpah's and McQueen's biggest financial success to date, earning more than $25 million at the box office.

Medical Services
One of the earliest medical doctors residing in Fabens was Dr. Donald Higdon.  His family settled there in 1954 when the population of Fabens was about 2500.  He both lived in Fabens and served the community.  

As a general practitioner, he was the primary physician in the relatively rural area.  Dr. Higdon was well known for his reputation for birthing babies in the area, traveling to the houses of expectant mothers to provide his services to the many who could not afford delivery in a hospital.  His numerical record of assisting at births set records for El Paso County and west Texas.

He served as the team doctor for the Fabens High School Wildcats during his time in Fabens.

2005 border incident
On February 17, 2005, Fabens was the nearest location to a border incident that made national headlines, when Border Patrol agents Ignacio Ramos and Jose Compean were convicted and sentenced to prison terms in excess of ten years for shooting Osbaldo Aldrete-Davila, an undocumented immigrant and alleged drug smuggler who was unarmed when he was shot.  Aldrete-Davila was then given immunity for his testimony and sued the border patrol for $5 million for violation of his civil rights.

Former Border Patrol agents Ramos and Compean had their sentences commuted by President George W. Bush during his last full day in office on January 19, 2009, although they did not receive a pardon for their convictions.  They were expected to be released from prison on March 20, 2009.

In addition, he was the on-call local physician and answered many emergency calls for assistance.

Demographics

2020 census

As of the 2020 United States census, there were 7,498 people, 1,511 households, and 1,045 families residing in the CDP.

2000 census
As of the census of 2000, there were 8,043 people, 2,147 households, and 1,874 families residing in the CDP. The population density was 2,179.8 people per square mile (841.6/km2). There were 2,279 housing units at an average density of 617.7/sq mi (238.5/km2). The racial makeup of the CDP was 3.30% White, 0.57% African American, 0.80% Native American, 1.02% Asian, 21.73% from other races, and 2.86% from two or more races. Hispanic or Latino were 96.16% of the population.

There were 2,147 households, out of which 55.9% had children under the age of 18 living with them, 59.7% were married couples living together, 23.5% had a female householder with no husband present, and 12.7% were non-families. 11.2% of all households were made up of individuals, and 5.6% had someone living alone who was 65 years of age or older. The average household size was 3.75 and the average family size was 4.07.

In the CDP, the population was spread out, with 39.3% under the age of 18, 11.1% from 18 to 24, 26.7% from 25 to 44, 15.1% from 45 to 64, and 7.8% who were 65 years of age or older. The median age was 25 years. For every 100 females, there were 92.2 males. For every 100 females age 18 and over, there were 84.9 males.

The median income for a household in the CDP was $18,486, and the median income for a family was $20,451. Males had a median income of $17,432 versus $16,354 for females. The per capita income for the CDP was $6,647. About 41.2% of families and 43.3% of the population were below the poverty line, including 49.4% of those under age 18 and 40.0% of those age 65 or over.

Education
 Fabens is served by the Fabens Independent School District.

References

Census-designated places in El Paso County, Texas
Census-designated places in Texas